William Baker may refer to:

Artists and designers
William Baker (fashion designer) (born 1973), English fashion designer
William Baker of Audlem (1705–1771), English architect
William A. Baker (1911–1981), American naval architect
William Bliss Baker (1859–1886), American landscape artist
William T. Baker (born 1956), American residential designer and author

Builders and engineers
William Baker, builder after whom Baker Street, London, is named
William Baker (engineer) (1817–1878), English railway engineer

Business leaders and owners
William Baker (printer) (1742–1785), English printer
William F. Baker (engineer) (born 1953), American partner at Skidmore, Owings & Merrill 
William F. Baker (television) (born 1942), retired American television executive
William Meath Baker (1857–1935), English pottery owner and benefactor
William O. Baker (1915–2005), former Bell Labs president

Military personnel
William Baker (Indian Army officer) (1888–1964), British officer who served in the Indian Army
William Baker (colonist) ( 1761–1836), British soldier and early Australian settler
William Erskine Baker (1808–1881), British Indian Army officer

Politicians

American politicians
William Baker (Kansas politician) (1831–1910), U.S. Representative from Kansas
William Baker (New York politician) (1795–1871), Speaker of the New York Assembly in 1834
William Benjamin Baker (1840–1911), U.S. Representative from Maryland
William C. Baker (1858–1931), mayor of Providence, Rhode Island
William H. Baker (Pennsylvania and Indiana politician), Pennsylvania state legislator and mayor of Evansville, Indiana
William H. Baker (1827–1911), U.S. Representative from New York
William Leonard Baker (1831–1893), Australian politician, member of the WA Legislative Assembly
William P. Baker (born 1940), U.S. Representative from California
William R. Baker (1820–1890), mayor of Houston, Texas
William Washington Baker (1844–1927), member of the Virginia House of Delegates
William Y. Baker (1829–?), Wisconsin State Assemblyman
Will Baker (born 1965), American perennial candidate

Commonwealth politicians
Sir William Baker (British politician) (1705–1770), British businessman and politician; Member of Parliament for Plympton Erle
William Baker (1743–1824), British Member of Parliament for Aldborough, Hertford, Hertfordshire and Plympton Erle
William Baker (Lower Canada politician) (1789–1866), politician in Lower Canada
William George Baker (1885–1960), politician in Saskatchewan, Canada

Religious figures
William Baker (bishop of Norwich) (1668–1732), Bishop of Bangor and of Norwich in the Church of England
William Baker (bishop of Zanzibar) (1902–1990), English Anglican Bishop of Zanzibar
William Baker (headmaster) (1841–1910), English headmaster and Church of England prebendary
William Baker (priest) (1870–1950), Anglican Archdeacon of Sheffield

Sports
William Baker (baseball) (1866–1930), owner of the Philadelphia Phillies, 1913–1930
William Baker (Surrey cricketer) (1807–1885), English cricketer
William de Chair Baker (1823–1888), English cricketer
William Baker (Kent cricketer) (1832–?), English cricketer
William Baker (footballer) (1882–1916), British footballer for Plymouth Argyle

Others
William Baker, real name of the fictional character Sandman
William Morrant Baker (1839–1896), English surgeon and describer of Baker's cyst
William E. Baker (1873–1954), United States federal judge
 William Baker was lynched on March 8, 1922

See also
Bill Baker (disambiguation)